The statue of Ludvig Holberg by Theobald Stein is together with Herman Wilhelm Bissen's statue of Adam Oehlenschläger flanking the main entrance to the Royal Danish Theatre on Kongens Nytorv in Copenhagen, Denmark. It was created by Stein in conjunction with the inauguration of Vilhelm Dahlerup's new theatre building in 1875. Bissen's statue of Oehlenschläger is from 1861 and was originally located on Sankt Annæ Plads.

Description
The bronze statue of Holberg depicts him in a comfortable pose, leaned back in an armchair with his right leg stretched out, holding  a book in one hand and his walking stick in the other. He is dressed in clothes typical of the late 18th century. Stein based his portrayl of Holberg on  Johan Roselius's portrait painting in Sorø Academy and Bertel Thorvaldsen's 1839  portrait bust. The statue  has been described as having "a subtly satirical facial expression as if he is watching all the Jean de Frances and political tinkers that are passing by on the square in front of him".

History
 
In 1851, Theobald Stein won Neuhausen's Prize with a half-size portrait statuette of Ludvig Holberg. The other participants in the competition were Otto Evens, Thorvald Mule and August Saabye. In the early 1870s, Stein was commissioned to create a colossal version of this early work for the new Royal Danish Theatre on Kongens Nytorv. Together with Herman Wilhelm Bissen's 1861 statue of Adam Oehlenschläger, which had until then been located on Sankt Annæ Plads, it was supposed to flank the main entrance of the new theatre building. honouring what was regarded as the two founding father's of Danish theatre. Since Bissen's statue of Oehlenschläger also depicted him seated in a chair with a book, Stein saw a need for his Holberg statue to stand out from it more clearly. On Wilhelm Marstrand's advice, he therefore chose to add a walking stick to the composition. The new building for the Royal Danish Theatre was inaugurated on 15 October 1984. The Ludvig Holberg statue was unvailed on 31 October 1875.

Other versions
The original plaster model  of Stein's portrait bust (signed "28 February 1850, original") was acquired by the Ny Carlsberg Glyptotek at an auction of Stein's estate on 2 April 1902. An 1851 plaster version of Stein's portrait statuette was acquired by the Royal Collection and is now in the collection of the National Gallery of Denmark. Two 190+ bronze casts of the 1851 stqatuette are on display in the Frederiksborg Museum in Hillerød and the Theatre Museum in Copenhagen.

References

External links
 Spurce

Statues of men in Copenhagen
Bronze sculptures in Copenhagen
Sculptures by Theobald Stein
1875 sculptures
Statues of writers
Cultural depictions of Ludvig Holberg